Yellow Is Forbidden is a 2018 New Zealand documentary film directed by Pietra Brettkelly. It was selected as the New Zealand entry for the Best Foreign Language Film at the 91st Academy Awards, but it was not nominated.

See also
 List of submissions to the 91st Academy Awards for Best Foreign Language Film
 List of New Zealand submissions for the Academy Award for Best Foreign Language Film

References

External links
 

2018 films
2018 documentary films
New Zealand documentary films
Chinese-language films